Saltash North was an electoral division of Cornwall in the United Kingdom which returned one member to sit on Cornwall Council between 2013 and 2021. It was abolished at the 2021 local elections, being succeeded by Saltash Tamar and Saltash Trematon and Landrake.

Councillors

Extent
Saltash North represented the north of the town of Saltash, including the suburb of Burraton and part of the suburb of South Pill (which was shared with the Saltash East division), as well as the hamlet of Carkeel. The division covered 453 hectares in total.

Election results

2017 election

2013 election

References

Electoral divisions of Cornwall Council